is a Japanese footballer.

Career statistics

Club
.

Notes

References

External links

2001 births
Living people
Japanese footballers
Association football goalkeepers
Fuji University alumni
J3 League players
Cerezo Osaka players
Cerezo Osaka U-23 players